The Isles of Notre Dame, formerly called Twillingate and Fogo, is a defunct provincial electoral district for the House of Assembly of Newfoundland and Labrador, Canada. As of 2011 the district had 6,990 eligible voters. The district was abolished in 2015 and largely replaced by Lewisporte-Twillingate.

This district was represented by former Liberal party leader, Gerry Reid from 1996 to 2007.

Members of the House of Assembly
The district has elected the following Members of the House of Assembly:

Twillingate

Fogo

Election results

Results as The Isles of Notre Dame

|-

|-

|-
 
|NDP
|Tree Walsh
|align="right"|252
|align="right"|6.17%
|align="right"|
|}

|-

|-

|}

Results as Twillingate and Fogo

|-

|-

|}

|-

|-

|-
 
|Independent
|Dallas Mitchell
|align="right"|270
|align="right"|5.32
|align="right"|
|}

Boundary description
The District of The Isles of Notre Dame shall consist of and include all that part of the Province of Newfoundland and Labrador to include the islands of Twillingate, New World Island, Change Islands, Fogo Island and the following adjacent islands: Black Island, Western Indian Island, Eastern Indian Island and Bacalhao Island.

Communities

References

External links 
Elections Newfoundland and Labrador
Website of the Newfoundland and Labrador House of Assembly

Newfoundland and Labrador provincial electoral districts